Nagarjuna College of Engineering & Technology (NCET), started in 2001, was founded by Sri. J.V.Ranga Raju, a leading industrialist and philanthropist and is run by the Nagarjuna Education Society today. It is located on Hyderabad highway, Bangalore North. The college organizes seminars, workshops, teaching talks, sports and extracurricular activities. College has 4,00,000 sq.ft of built-up area.Nagarjuna Institute of Engineering Technology & Management

Courses 
Nagarjuna College of Engineering & Technology (NCET)(An Autonomous College under VTU from 2015-16) was established in 1995 with the basic courses of Civil, Mechanical, Electronics & Communication, Computer Science and Information Science. The college is now granted with Autonomous Status from VTU from the year 2015–16. The college offers undergraduate program leading to 4 years Bachelors and 2 years master's degree of the Visvesvaraya Technological University in the following streams.

Undergraduate Departments 
NCET offers Bachelor of Engineering (B.E.) 4 year degree programs in following disciplines under Autonomous scheme:
 Mechanical Engineering
 Electronics and Communication Engineering
 Civil Engineering
 Computer Science Engineering
 Information Science Engineering

Postgraduate Departments 
NCET offers post graduations programs (2 years) in following disciplines under autonomous scheme: 
 M.Tech (Structural Engineering)
 M.Tech (Construction Technology)
 M.B.A.

References

External links
 Nagarjuna College of Engineering and Technology Website

Engineering colleges in Bangalore
Affiliates of Visvesvaraya Technological University
Educational institutions established in 2001
2001 establishments in Karnataka